Lyndhurst, an electoral district of the Legislative Assembly in the Australian state of New South Wales, had one incarnation, from 1913 to 1920.


Election results

Elections in the 1910s

1917

1913

Notes

References

New South Wales state electoral results by district